Dale Caya is a retired American soccer goalkeeper who was the 1990 American Professional Soccer League Goalkeeper of the Year.

Caya attended Temple University, playing on the men's soccer team from 1982 to 1985.  In 1988, he played for the amateur Philadelphia Inter.  In July 1989, Caya signed with the Penn-Jersey Football Club.  In 1990, the club entered the American Soccer League as the Penn-Jersey Spirit.  Caya was selected as first team all league that season.  In 1991, he was on the roster of the Spirit for a handful of games, but never came off the bench.  In 1992, he graduated from the Widener University School of Law.

References

Living people
American soccer players
American Professional Soccer League players
Penn-Jersey Spirit players
Temple Owls men's soccer players
Association football goalkeepers
Year of birth missing (living people)